A constitutional referendum was held in Guatemala on 30 January 1994. It followed a constitutional crisis and an attempted self-coup on 25 May 1993 by President Jorge Serrano Elías. Among the reforms was a plan to reduce the parliamentary term of the current government. The changes were approved by 83.9% of voters, although voter turnout was just 15.9%.

Results

References

1994 referendums
Referendums in Guatemala
1994 in Guatemala
Constitutional referendums